Courtney Simon (born June 23, 1946) is an American writer and actress. Simon is sometimes credited as "Courtney Sherman" or "Courtney Sherman Simon". Simon is best known for having created the role of Kathy Phillips on the long-running soap opera Search for Tomorrow.

Career

Acting roles 
Simon is best known for having created the role of Kathy Phillips on the long-running soap opera Search for Tomorrow.

She has also played roles on Guiding Light (Dinah Buckley), All My Children, and Another World. Her more recent acting work has been on a recurring basis. As a featured actress, she is best known for playing Dr. Lynn Michaels on As the World Turns.

Writing work 
Simon began to contribute to shows as a writer while she was still a cast member at  
Search for Tomorrow. She has worked steadily as a breakdown script writer ever since. With recurring, part-time acting roles, she has occasionally worked at a show as a writer and as an actor; she has also worked on one show as a writer while appearing on another program as an actor.

Positions held 
All My Children (hired by Lorraine Broderick)
 Script Writer: 1996 - 1997

Another World
 Script Writer: 1998 - June 25, 1999

As the World Turns (hired by Susan Bedsow Horgan)
 Script Writer: 1984 - 1985, 2000 - 2001
 Script Editor: 2001 - January 24, 2008, April 18, 2008 - September 2010

General Hospital
 Script Writer: 1997 - 1998

Guiding Light (hired by Nancy Curlee)
 Writer: 1992 - 1993

Loving
 Writer: 1991

Santa Barbara
 Script Writer: 1986 - 1991

Search for Tomorrow
 Script Writer: 1982 - 1984

Awards and nominations
Daytime Emmy Awards

WINS
(1989; Best Writing; Santa Barbara)
(1993; Best Writing; Guiding Light)
(1997; Best Writing; All My Children)
(2001, 2002, 2004 & 2005; Best Writing; As the World Turns)

NOMINATIONS 
(1986; Best Writing; As the World Turns)
(1988 & 1990; Best Writing; Santa Barbara)
(1998; Best Writing; General Hospital)
(2003, 2006 & 2010; Best Writing; As the World Turns)

Writers Guild of America Award

WINS
(1985 season; Search for Tomorrow)
(1991 & 1992 seasons; Santa Barbara)
(1997 season; All My Children)
(1998 season; General Hospital)
(2007 & 2009 seasons; As the World Turns)

NOMINATIONS 
(1995 & 1996 seasons; Guiding Light)
(1998 season; All My Children)
(1999 season; General Hospital)
(2008 & 2010 seasons; As the World Turns)
(2011 & 2013 seasons; One Life to Live)

Personal life 
Simon's first marriage, to Ed Easton, ended in divorce. She met actor Peter Simon while they were both part of the cast on Search for Tomorrow. The couple married in 1975 and have raised five children (some from previous marriages, as well as one born to the couple, Kate Hall, who is also a daytime soap writer).

References

External links
 

American soap opera writers
American soap opera actresses
1946 births
Living people
Writers Guild of America Award winners
21st-century American women